Nupserha quadrioculata is a species of beetle in the family Cerambycidae. It was described by Thunberg in 1787, originally under the genus Saperda. It is known from Laos, Indonesia, China, and Vietnam.

Varietas
 Nupserha quadrioculata var. notaticeps Pic, 1926
 Nupserha quadrioculata var. corrugata Gressitt, 1940

References

quadrioculata
Beetles described in 1787